The voiced palatal lateral flap is a rare type of consonantal sound, used in some spoken languages. There is no dedicated symbol in the International Phonetic Alphabet that represents this sound. However, the symbol for a palatal lateral approximant with a breve denoting extra-short  may be used.

Features
Features of the voiced palatal lateral flap:

Occurrence
The Iwaidja and Ilgar languages of Australia have a palatal lateral flap as well as alveolar and retroflex lateral flaps. However, the palatal flap has not been shown to be phonemic; it may instead be an underlying sequence .

References

Lateral consonants
Palatal consonants
Tap and flap consonants
Pulmonic consonants
Voiced oral consonants